Kerry Ardeen Lacy (born August 7, 1972)  is a former relief pitcher in Major League Baseball who played from  through  for the Boston Red Sox.

In a two-season career, Lacy posted a 3–1 record with a 5.59 ERA and three saves in 44 appearances, including 27 strikeouts, 15 games finished, and 56.1 innings of work. All 3 of Lacy's saves came in 1997.

External links

Boston Red Sox players
Major League Baseball pitchers
Baseball players from Tennessee
1972 births
Living people
Nashua Pride players
Sportspeople from Chattanooga, Tennessee
Butte Copper Kings players
Charleston Rainbows players
Gastonia Rangers players
Iowa Cubs players
Oklahoma City 89ers players
Pawtucket Red Sox players
Charlotte Rangers players
Tulsa Drillers players